Derrick Edwards (born 24 May 1968), is an Antiguan and Barbudan former footballer and manager of the Antigua and Barbuda national team. He is currently the head coach of Grenades F.C.

International career
Nicknamed "Pretty Boy", Edwards made his debut for Antigua and Barbuda in 1988 and was member of the national team for 12 years. He played in 10 FIFA World Cup qualification games.

After retiring as a player, he became coach of SAP F.C. and then national team coach in 2006.

International goals

Scores and results list Antigua's goal tally first, score column indicates score after each Antigua goal.

References

External links
 
 Profile at Soccerway.com
 Profile at Soccerpunter.com

1968 births
Living people
Antigua and Barbuda footballers
Antigua and Barbuda international footballers
Antigua and Barbuda football managers
Antigua and Barbuda national football team managers
Association football defenders